Inoka Ranaweera (born 18 February 1986) is a Sri Lankan cricketer and the former One Day International (ODI) captain. She has played at both ODI and Twenty20 International (T20I) level for the Sri Lankan national side. In an ODI against New Zealand in November 2015, she took three wickets from the last three balls of the innings, becoming the first Sri Lankan woman to take an ODI hat-trick.

She has won the Sri Lanka Cricket award for the Women's ODI Bowler of the Year in 2016 and 2017. In October 2021, she was named in Sri Lanka's team for the 2021 Women's Cricket World Cup Qualifier tournament in Zimbabwe. In January 2022, she was named in Sri Lanka's team for the 2022 Commonwealth Games Cricket Qualifier tournament in Malaysia. In July 2022, she was named in Sri Lanka's team for the cricket tournament at the 2022 Commonwealth Games in Birmingham, England.

See also
 List of women's international cricket hat-tricks

References

1986 births
Living people
Asian Games medalists in cricket
Cricketers at the 2014 Asian Games
Asian Games bronze medalists for Sri Lanka
Medalists at the 2014 Asian Games
People from Southern Province, Sri Lanka
Sri Lanka women cricket captains
Sri Lanka women One Day International cricketers
Sri Lanka women Twenty20 International cricketers
Sri Lankan women cricketers
Women's One Day International cricket hat-trick takers
Cricketers at the 2022 Commonwealth Games
Commonwealth Games competitors for Sri Lanka